Prigorodny is a rural locality (a settlement) in Kargopolsky District, Arkhangelsk Oblast, Russia. The population was 565 as of 2010. There are 10 streets.

Geography 
Prigorodny is located 3 km west of Kargopol (the district's administrative centre) by road. Kargopol is the nearest rural locality.

References 

Rural localities in Kargopolsky District